BattleBots is an American robot combat television series.  Competitors design and operate remote-controlled armed and armored machines designed to fight in an arena combat elimination tournament.  The following is a list of BattleBots episodes.

Series overview

Episodes

Season 1 (2000)

Tournament Winners: 
Super heavyweight Winner – Minion (defeated Gray Matter, Grendel, Rammstein, and DooAll)
Heavyweight Winner – Vlad the Impaler (defeated GoldDigger, Tazbot, Overkill, Punjar and Voltarc)
Middleweight Winner – Hazard (defeated Pegleg, Turtle Roadkill, Spin Orbiting Force, and Deadblow)
Lightweight Winner – Backlash (defeated Disposable Hero,	Endotherm, The Crusher, Das Bot, and Alpha Raptor)

Season 2 (2000–01)
Tournament Winners: November 2000, Las Vegas: (Winners shown in bold)
Super heavyweight Winner – Diesector (defeated Hamunaptra, World Peace, Rammstein, War Machine, and Atomic Wedgie)
Heavyweight Winner – BioHazard (defeated M.O.E., Suicidal Tendencies, Nightmare, frenZy and Vlad the Impaler)
Middleweight Winner – Spaz (defeated Tobor Rabies, Blue Streak, Buddy Lee Don't Play in the Street, Bad Attitude, and El Diablo)
Lightweight Winner – Ziggo (defeated Scrap Metal, Scrap Daddy LW55, Afterthought 2.0, Beta Raptor, and Backlash)

Season 3 (2001)
Tournament Winners: May 2001, Treasure Island (Winners shown in bold)
 Super heavyweight Winner – Vladiator (defeated JuggerBot, Hammertime, Revision Z, Techno Destructo, Diesector, and Minion)
 Heavyweight Winner – Son of Whyachi (defeated Shaka, Crab Meat, Kill-O-Amp, Nightmare, MechaVore, HexaDecimator, and BioHazard)
 Middleweight Winner – Hazard (defeated Fusion, Zion, F5, T-Wrex, and Little Drummer Boy)
 Lightweight Winner – Dr. Inferno Jr. (defeated Blood Dragon, Toe-Crusher, Bad Habit, Herr Gepoünden, Sallad, and Gamma Raptor)

Season 4 (2001)
Tournament Winners: November 2001, Treasure Island: (Winners shown in bold)
Super heavyweight Winner – Toro (defeated Maximus, The Judge, Vladiator, Little Blue Engine, and New Cruelty)
Heavyweight Winner – BioHazard (defeated Stealth Terminator, Jabberwock, Nightmare, Tazbot, and OverKill)
Middleweight Winner – Hazard (defeated Timmy, SABotage, El Diablo, Heavy Metal Noise and Complete Control)
Lightweight Winner – Ziggo (defeated SnowFlake, Serial Box Killer, Wedge of Doom, Death By Monkeys, and The Big B)

Season 5 (2002)
Tournament Winners: May 2002, Treasure Island: (Winners shown in bold)
Super heavyweight Winner – Diesector (defeated Final Destiny, Dreadnought, Hammertime, New Cruelty, and Vladiator)
Heavyweight Winner – BioHazard (defeated Center Punch, Greenspan, MechaVore, Aces and Eights, and Voltronic)
Middleweight Winner – T-Minus (defeated TriDent, Double Agent, Huggy Bear, previously undefeated Hazard, and S.O.B.)
Lightweight Winner – Dr. Inferno Jr. (defeated Afterburner, Tentoumushi 8.0, Death By Monkeys, Gamma Raptor, and Wedge of Doom)

Season 6 (2015)

Winner: Bite Force

Season 7 (2016)

Winner: Tombstone

Season 8 (2018)

Winner: Bite Force

Season 9 (2019)

Winner: Bite Force

Season 10 (2020–21)

Winner: End Game

Season 11 (2022)

Winner: Tantrum

Season 12 (2023)

References

External links

BattleBots
Lists of American non-fiction television series episodes